Pakhtalovo is a rural locality (a village) in Staroselskoye Rural Settlement, Vologodsky District, Vologda Oblast, Russia. The population was three in 2002.

Geography 
Obukhovo is the nearest rural locality.

References 

Rural localities in Vologodsky District